Tibooburra (pronounced  or ) is a town in the far northwest of New South Wales, Australia, located  from the state capital, Sydney. It is most frequently visited by tourists on their way to Sturt National Park or on the way to or from Innamincka in South Australia and Birdsville in Queensland.
Although facilities in Tibooburra are quite limited, fuel, meals, and a range of accommodation options are available.  All significant support services (medical, dental, hospital, retail, mechanical, commercial) are based in Broken Hill.

The New South Wales National Parks and Wildlife Service has a tourist information centre in the township.  There is also a police station.  There is an airstrip about 6 km east of the village. The road from Broken Hill was finally completely sealed in 2020 and officially opened in July 2020.

History

Tibooburra is in the traditional lands of the Karenggapa Aboriginal peoples.

Explorer Charles Sturt was one of the first Europeans to visit the area in 1844.  He spent six months trapped by drought at Depot Glen, south of Tibooburra.  He then tried to travel north west and was defeated by the desert.  Burke and Wills also went through the area in 1861 on the journey north towards the Gulf of Carpentaria.  It was the search for Burke and Wills that led to the opening up of the country for the pastoral industry.

Following a gold rush to the Albert Goldfields (centred at nearby Milparinka), gold was found around Tibooburra in 1880.  At first the area was called The Granites. When in 1881 the goldfields warden W.H.J. Slee (resident at Milparinka) had a town laid out he named it Tibooburra. Although he named the streets after European explorers, he preferred the Aboriginal name for the locality for the town.  Slee had his observations on Aboriginal customs in the Tibooburra region published by the Linnean Society of NSW.  The town's name could be derived from an Aboriginal word for heap of boulders. There was drought in 1884. In 1887 Slee reported that there were 19 gold puddling machines at work, with a population at and about Tibooburra of 250. It was said that gold was found exposed in the streets after heavy rain.

By the turn of the 20th Century (1900) the gold mining activity had waned, to be replaced by the pastoral industry.  Sheep stations, necessarily large in area due to the aridity, were the mainstay of Tibooburra until the 1980s, providing most of the social and commercial activity.  For over a century the township had remained remote because of rough unsealed roads, but with the popularity of 4WD driving, and ever increased bitumen roads, it became within comfortable reach of the tourism industry.

In more recent times musicians and artists, in particular Clifton Pugh, became fascinated with this remote outback region.  Pugh often stayed at the Family Hotel (opened 1882) where he painted a number of murals, drawings, and sketches on an inside wall of the hotel.

Tourist attractions
Apart from the arid landscape, the main natural tourist attraction is the remarkable granite rock outcrops which erupt immediately beside (and even among) the town streets.  Historic buildings, harking back to the pioneering era, are found about the town.  Nearby is Sturt National Park, which incorporates Cameron Corner, where the borders of three States meet; Queensland, South Australia and New South Wales.  The dog fence along the borders is also an important tourist attraction. Although there is a "settlement" at Cameron Corner, services there are even more limited.

The Family Hotel (as mentioned above) and the more substantial Tibooburra Hotel (the Two Storey Hotel) both attract tourists for a drink or two. There is also a drive-in theatre in the main street.

Heritage listings 
The Mount Wood Station is a heritage-listed former cattle station in the Sturt National Park.

Tibooburra Outback School of the Air
Tibooburra Outback School of the Air is the town's education provider, servicing both the local residents and the children of property owners in the area. It was established as a Distance Education Centre in 1991 by Tony Bush after being approved for the project in 1990. Prior to that students attended in town, and students on properties were educated through central schools further afield in towns such as Broken Hill. The school itself was established in 1886. No high school facilities exist in the town, children travel 365 km to the nearest high school, do home schooling, or attend boarding schools.

Once a term students from the external properties attend a 'mini-school' at the school. Mini-schools typically have themes (such as pirates or the circus) and consist of a range of fun and educational activities. Out of town families also receive two home visits a year, in which a teacher (or teachers) and students visit and spend the day on the property.

In 2004 the school switched from radio based education to the Satellite Education Program.

Climate
Tibooburra has a hot desert climate (BWh) with temperatures regularly reaching above  in summer. In its driest year of 1919, only  fell.

See also
 Tibooburra Airport

References

External links
New South Wales National Parks and Wildlife Service
Information about Tibooburra and the Corner Country

 
Towns in New South Wales
Unincorporated Far West Region
Far West (New South Wales)
Mining towns in New South Wales